Chocianowice  (Silesian: Koćanowicy, German: Kotschanowitz, Kiefernrode) is a village in the administrative district of Gmina Lasowice Wielkie, within Kluczbork County, Opole Voivodeship, in south-western Poland.

The village has a population of 1,170.

References

Villages in Kluczbork County